"Hey!" is the sixteenth single released by Japanese artist Masaharu Fukuyama. It reached number-one on the Oricon Charts with 187,140 sold in its first week. It was released on October 12, 2000.

Track listing
Hey!
Ieji (家路)
Hey! (The victory run)
Ieji (Putting on the laurel crown)
Hey! (original karaoke)
Ieji (original karaoke)

Oricon sales chart (Japan)

References

2000 singles
Masaharu Fukuyama songs
Oricon Weekly number-one singles
2000 songs